Rovačko Trebaljevo is a village in the municipality of Kolašin, Montenegro.

Demographics
According to the 2011 census, its population was 208.

References

Populated places in Kolašin Municipality